Gia Viễn is a rural district of Ninh Bình province in the Red River Delta region of Vietnam. As of 2008 the district had a population of 119,284. The district covers an area of 176 km2. The district capital lies at Me.

Photos of Gia Viễn

References

External links 

Districts of Ninh Bình province